Erwin Leonard Guy Abel (23 October 1911 – 1 May 1995) was a New Zealand grocer, businessman, athlete and racehorse owner. He was born in Ohakune, Ruapehu District, New Zealand on 23 October 1911. Abel opened New Zealand's first shopping mall, The Big A Plaza, at Glenview, Hamilton in October 1969.

References

1911 births
1995 deaths
20th-century New Zealand businesspeople
New Zealand male marathon runners
People from Ohakune
New Zealand racehorse owners and breeders